, better known by the Kana form of her name , is a Japanese voice actress from Kamifukuoka, Saitama (now Fujimino, Saitama).

Filmography

Anime television series
 After War Gundam X (Sala Tyrell) (voice acting debut)
 AKB0048 (Katagiri Tsubasa / Shinoda Mariko The 7th)
 Ask Dr. Rin! (Banri Shijō)
 Baka and Test series (Yōko Takahashi)
 Black Heaven (OL)
 Bleach (Ririn, Gina)
 The Candidate for Goddess (Leena Fujimura, Yukine Simmons)
 Ceres, The Celestial Legend (Aya Mikage)
 Cyber Team in Akihabara (Dark Pigeon/Hatoko Daikan'yama)
 Descendants of Darkness (Maki)
 Devil May Cry: The Animated Series (Cindy)
 D.I.C.E. (Marsha Rizarov)
 Divergence Eve (Misaki Kureha)
 Do It Yourself!! (Haruko Hoketsu)
 Doraemon (2005–present), (Shizuka Minamoto 
 Fate/kaleid liner Prisma Illya 3rei!! (Magical Sapphire)
 Flint the Time Detective (Princess Kaguya, Yunīta)
 Fullmetal Alchemist (Lyra/Dante)
 Gantz (Sadayo Suzumura)
 Geneshaft (Lieutenant Mir Lotus)
 Genesis of Aquarion (Silvia de Alisia)
 Ghost in the Shell: Stand Alone Complex (Tokura Eka)
 Godannar (Shizuru Fujimura)
 Healin' Good Pretty Cure (Mei Hiramatsu)
 Hikaru no Go (Akari Fujisaki)
 Hoshin Engi (Daji)
 Hungry Heart: Wild Striker (Rie Koboku)
 Initial D (Sayuki)
 Inuyasha (Eri, Ayame)
 The King of Braves GaoGaiGar Final -Grand Glorious Gathering- (Renais Cardiff Shishio)
 Kochira Katsushika-ku Kameari Kōen-mae Hashutsujo (Ibu Honda (second voice))
 Kyo Kara Maoh! (Miko Shibuya)
 Loveless (Yamato Nakano)
 Lovely Idol (Reiko Nakazawa)
 Machine Robo Rescue (Nina)
 Medabots (Kokuryū, Momoko)
 Meine Liebe (Robertine)
 Mon Colle Knights (Songstress of the Flower Garden)
 Nobunaga the Fool (Hiraga Gennai)
 Nurarihyon no Mago (Kejoro)
 Onegai My Melody (Johnny)
 Onmyō Taisenki (Misasa)
 Ojarumaru (Mutsuko)
 Pokémon (Kei, Mikan)
 Pokémon: Advanced Generation (Annu)
 RahXephon (Hiroko Asahina)
 Rockman.EXE Stream (Meddy)
 Saikano (Satomi)
 Saint Beast (Yuria)
 Samurai Deeper Kyo (Okuni, Jijin)
 Sister Princess (Haruka)
 Skull Man (Sayoko Karasuma)
 Someday's Dreamers (Takako Kawara)
 Soreike! Anpanman (Isoben)
 Steam Detectives (Misa Anan, newspaper reporter (Lily Edogawa))
 Stratos 4 (Mikaze Honjō)
 Superior Defender Gundam Force (Alicia)
Super Robot Wars Original Generation: Divine Wars (Seolla Schweitzer)
 Tokyo Mew Mew (Mint Aizawa)
 Tsukihime, Lunar Legend (Hisui)
 Tsukuyomi -Moon Phase- (Elfriede)
 Uta Kata (Maki)
 Vampiyan Kids (Princess Castanet)
 Vandread (Dita Liebely)
 Yu-Gi-Oh! (Anzu  Mazaki)
 Hera (One piece)
 Cocotama Series
 Kamisama Minarai: Himitsu no Cocotama (Oshaki)
 Kira Kira Happy Hirake! Cocotama (Ojou)

Original video animation (OVA) 
 Final Fantasy VII Advent Children (Yuffie Kisaragi)
 Genesis of Aquarion (Silvia de Alisia)
 The King of Braves GaoGaiGar Final (Renais Cardiff Shishio)
 Legend of the Galactic Heroes: Spiral Labyrinth (Mirriam Roses)
 Super Robot Wars Original Generation: The Animation (Seolla Schweizer)
 Tenbatsu! Angel Rabbie (Fia Note)
 True Love Story Summer Days, and yet... (Akimi Arimori)

Theatrical animation 
 Buddha 2: Tezuka Osamu no Buddha (Princess Yashodara)
 Cyberteam in Akihabara: The Movie (Hatoko Daikanyama)
 Doraemon: New Nobita's Great Demon—Peko and the Exploration Party of Five (Shizuka Minamoto)
 Doraemon: Nobita and the Birth of Japan 2016 (Shizuka Minamoto)
 Doraemon: Nobita and the Green Giant Legend (Shizuka Minamoto)
 Doraemon: Nobita and the Island of Miracles—Animal Adventure (Shizuka Minamoto)
 Doraemon: Nobita and the New Steel Troops—Winged Angels (Shizuka Minamoto)
 Doraemon: Nobita's Chronicle of the Moon Exploration (Shizuka Minamoto)
 Doraemon: Nobita's Dinosaur 2006 (Shizuka Minamoto)
 Doraemon: Nobita's Great Battle of the Mermaid King (Shizuka Minamoto)
 Doraemon: Nobita's Little Star Wars 2021 (Shizuka Minamoto)
 Doraemon: Nobita's New Dinosaur (Shizuka Minamoto)
 Doraemon: Nobita's New Great Adventure into the Underworld - The Seven Magic Users (Shizuka Minamoto)
 Doraemon: Nobita's Space Hero Record of Space Heroes (Shizuka Minamoto)
 Doraemon: Nobita's Treasure Island (Shizuka Minamoto)
 Doraemon: Nobita's Secret Gadget Museum (Shizuka Minamoto)
 Doraemon: The Record of Nobita's Spaceblazer (Shizuka Minamoto)
 Fullmetal Alchemist the Movie: Conqueror of Shamballa (Actress)
 Initial D: Third Stage (Sayuki)
 King of Fighters Yagami Iori Original CD Drama: Yuuhi no Tsuki ~ Prologue (Kikuri Tanima)
 Pia Carrot e Yokoso!!–Sayaka no Koi Monogatari (Sayaka Takai)
 RahXephon: Pluralitas Concentio (Hiroko Asahina)
 Stand by Me Doraemon (Shizuka Minamoto)
 Stand by Me Doraemon 2 (Shizuka Minamoto)
 Yu-Gi-Oh! (Anzu Mazaki)

Video games 
 Another Century's Episode 3 (2007) (Sala Tyrell)
 Inazuma Eleven (2008) (Otonashi Haruna)
 Castlevania: Portrait of Ruin (Charlotte Aulin)
 Dead or Alive 6 (Kula Diamond)
 Ehrgeiz (Yuffie Kisaragi)
 Fate/Grand Order (Magical Sapphire)
 Final Fantasy
 Dirge of Cerberus: Final Fantasy VII (Yuffie Kisaragi)
 Dissidia Final Fantasy Opera Omnia (Yuffie Kisaragi)
 Final Fantasy VII Remake Intergrade (Yuffie Kisaragi)
 Fire Emblem Heroes (Ethlyn)
 Granblue Fantasy (Shizuka Minamoto)
 Initial D Arcade Stage series (Sayuki)
 Kingdom Hearts (Yuffie Kisaragi)
 Kingdom Hearts II (Yuffie Kisaragi)
 Kingdom Hearts III Re Mind (Yuffie Kisaragi)
 The King of Fighters
 The King of Fighters 2000 (Kula Diamond, Lilly Kane)
 The King of Fighters 2001 (Kula Diamond)
 The King of Fighters 2002 (Kula Diamond)
 The King of Fighters XI (Kula Diamond)
 The King of Fighters: Maximum Impact 2 (Kula Diamond, Lilly Kane)
 The King of Fighters XIII (Kula Diamond)
 The King of Fighters XIV (Kula Diamond)
 The King of Fighters All Star (Kula Diamond)
 The King of Fighters XV (Kula Diamond)
 Neo Geo Heroes: Ultimate Shooting (Kula Diamond)
 Samurai Shodown: Warriors Rage (Mikoto)
 Shinobi Master Senran Kagura: New Link (Kula Diamond)
 SNK Heroines: Tag Team Frenzy (Kula Diamond)
 Super Robot Wars
 Super Robot Wars Alpha Gaiden (Sala Tyrell)
 Super Robot Wars Alpha 2 (Seolla Schweizer)
 Super Robot Wars GC (Fairy Firefly)
 Super Robot Wars Alpha 3 (Seolla Schweizer, Renais Cardiff Shishio)
 Super Robot Wars Original Generations (Seolla Schweizer)
 Super Robot Wars Z (Silvia de Alisia, Sala Tyrell, Celiane)
 Tales series
 Tales of Versus (Nanaly Fletch)
 Tales of the World: Radiant Mythology 3 (Nanaly Fletch)
 Tales of the Ray (Nanaly Fletch)
 Tokyo Mew Mew (Mint Aizawa)

References

External links 
 
 
 Genki Project

1973 births
Living people
Japanese video game actresses
Japanese voice actresses
Voice actresses from Saitama Prefecture
20th-century Japanese actresses
21st-century Japanese actresses